Oleg Vladimirovich Gerasimenko (born 5 May 1990) is a Russian former professional football player.

Club career
He played one season in the Russian Football National League for FC Fakel Voronezh.

External links
 

1990 births
Footballers from Voronezh
Living people
Russian footballers
Association football forwards
FC Fakel Voronezh players
FC Oryol players